The 2016 WNBA season was the 20th season for the San Antonio Stars franchise of the WNBA. It was their 14th in San Antonio.

Transactions

WNBA Draft

Trades

2016 roster

Schedule
San Antonio Stars Schedule 2016

Preseason

Playoffs

Statistics

Regular season

Awards and honors

References

External links
The Official Site of the San Antonio Stars

San Antonio Stars seasons
San Antonio Stars